Patricia Joen "Patti" or "P.J." Cooksey (born February 25, 1958 in Youngstown, Ohio, United States) is a retired jockey from American Thoroughbred racing. She won her first race with Turf Advisor at Waterford Park (now Mountaineer Park) in 1979. A four-time Turfway Park leading rider, Cooksey has won 2,137 wins since beginning her career in 1979, and she was the all-time leading female jockey by number of victories before Julie Krone overtook her.

In 1985 she became the first female jockey to ride in the Preakness Stakes, finishing 6th aboard Tajawa. In 2004, she became the first ever female jockey to be voted the NYRA's Mike Venezia Memorial Award, an honor given annually to a jockey who exemplifies extraordinary sportsmanship and citizenship.

Seriously injured during a race at Keeneland on April 12, 2003, Cooksey did not return to riding until March 2004. Suffering from servere pain as a result of a rod in her leg from the injury, she retired permanently in late June of that year, ranked second all-time in wins by a female jockey.

Cooksey has been a commentor for Louisville, Kentucky television stations and did reporting for ESPN on horseback during the 2006 Breeders' Cup broadcast.

References 

1958 births
Living people
American female jockeys
People from Shelbyville, Kentucky
People from Georgetown, Kentucky
Sportspeople from Kentucky
Sportspeople from Youngstown, Ohio
American horse racing announcers
American sports announcers
Women sports announcers
Kentucky women in equestrian field
21st-century American women
20th-century American women